Ouffet is a municipality of Wallonia located in the province of liège, Belgium. 

On January 1, 2006, Ouffet had a total population of 2,529. The total area is 40.22 km2 which gives a population density of 63 inhabitants per km2.

The municipality consists of the following districts: Ellemelle, Ouffet, and Warzée.

See also
 List of protected heritage sites in Ouffet

References

External links
 

Municipalities of Liège Province